Challenger Glacier is a tidewater glacier on the north side of Heard Island in the southern Indian Ocean. To the east of Challenger Glacier is Downes Glacier, whose terminus is located at Mechanics Bay, between Saddle Point and Cape Bidlingmaier. To the west of Challenger Glacier is Baudissin Glacier, whose terminus is located at the western side of Corinthian Bay, near Sealers Cove.

Discovery and naming
The glacier appears to have been first charted by the Gauss expedition under Erich von Drygalski, 1901–03, who portrayed a single large glacier flowing into Corinthian Bay. In 1948 the Australian National Antarctic Research Expeditions (ANARE) determined that more than one glacier discharges into Corinthian Bay. ANARE applied the name Challenger Glacier to the easternmost of these glaciers to commemorate the work of the British Challenger Expedition, 1873–76.

References

Further reading

External links
Click here to see a map of Heard Island and McDonald Islands, including all major topographical features
Australian Antarctic Division
Australian Antarctic Gazetteer
Composite Gazetteer of Antarctica
Australian Antarctic Names and Medals Committee (AANMC)
United States Geological Survey, Geographic Names Information System (GNIS)
Scientific Committee on Antarctic Research (SCAR)
 

Glaciers of Heard Island and McDonald Islands